The dark-backed weaver (Ploceus bicolor), also known as the forest weaver, is a species of bird in the family Ploceidae.
It is found in Angola, Burundi, Cameroon, Republic of the Congo, Democratic Republic of the Congo, Equatorial Guinea, Eswatini, Gabon, Kenya, Malawi, Mozambique, Nigeria, Rwanda, Somalia, South Africa, South Sudan, Tanzania, Uganda, Zambia, and Zimbabwe.

References

External links
 Dark-backed weaver -  Species text in Weaver Watch.

 (Dark-backed weaver = ) Forest weaver - Species text in The Atlas of Southern African Birds.
image at ADW

dark-backed weaver
Birds of the Gulf of Guinea
Birds of Sub-Saharan Africa
dark-backed weaver
Taxa named by Louis Jean Pierre Vieillot
Taxonomy articles created by Polbot